Kashyap Prajapati (born 11 October 1995) is an Indian-born cricketer who plays for the Oman cricket team. In September 2021, he was named in Oman's One Day International (ODI) squad for round seven of the 2019–2023 ICC Cricket World Cup League 2. He made his ODI debut on 26 September 2021, for Oman against Papua New Guinea. He made his Twenty20 International (T20I) debut on 17 October 2021, for Oman against Papua New Guinea, in the opening match of the 2021 ICC Men's T20 World Cup.

On 12 June 2022, in round 13 of the 2019–2023 ICC Cricket World Cup League 2 tournament, Prajapati scored his first century in ODI cricket, with 103 against the United States.

References

External links
 

1995 births
Living people
Omani cricketers
Oman One Day International cricketers
Oman Twenty20 International cricketers
People from Kheda district
Indian emigrants to Oman
Indian expatriates in Oman
Cricketers from Gujarat